KF Besa Sllupçan (FK Besa) is a football club based in the village of Sllupçan near Kumanovo, North Macedonia. They are currently competing in the Macedonian Third League (North Division).

History
The club was founded in 1990.

References

External links
Besa Slupčane Facebook 
Club info at MacedonianFootball 
Football Federation of Macedonia 

Besa Slupcane
Association football clubs established in 1990
1990 establishments in the Socialist Republic of Macedonia
Lipkovo Municipality
Besa-Vlazrimi